Benjamin Lee (1774 – December 27, 1828) was an American military leader and political figure.  He was born in Robeson County, North Carolina in 1774 to Jesse Lee Sr., a soldier who served in the North Carolina State Militia during the American Revolution.  In 1802 and 1803, Benjamin Lee served as the representative of Robeson County in the lower House of the North Carolina General Assembly and from 1804 to 1810 he was the senator for Robeson County.

Life
In 1807 he was commissioned as the Brigadier General of the 14th Brigade of the North Carolina State Militia, a post he still held as late as 1812.  In 1816, he had the sad task to settle the estate of his father, who died in August of that year.

It appears that, with his family living in Marion County, Mississippi, he moved to be with them.  In 1818, Benjamin Lee served as a Justice of the Marion County Orphans Court and from 1819 to 1820 he served as the Chief Justice.

In 1820, Lee and seven other men on February 10 opened Columbia’s first school, “Columbian Academy,” of which they were the incorporators and trustees.  One year later, the state of Mississippi made the first effort to fund education.  Also in January 1821, a November session of the General Assembly was planned to be held in Columbia.

In August 1821, Lee and three other candidates divided 1,758 votes for Lt. Governor of Mississippi, which could indicate he may have helped bring the General Assembly to Columbia.  In 1825, Benjamin Lee bought 600 acres from John Lott Sr. for $2,000, located in Columbia, Mississippi from 2nd Street to behind the Marion County courthouse.  By 1828 he opened a store listed as “Lee and Atkinson,” with Col. James Atkinson as his partner. Atkinson was the grandfather of Marion County Sheriff Oscar Foxworth and the ancestor of other notable citizens.  

In 1827, Benjamin Lee is found in the race for Lieutenant Governor, garnering 3,650 votes to Abram Scott’s 5,454 votes.

General Benjamin Lee died two days after Christmas in 1828.  He was buried in the cemetery he designed. His is the oldest known grave in the Old Columbia City Cemetery, in Columbia, Mississippi, located across from Citizen’s Bank.

Legacy
Years after his death, the ferry he owned which crossed the Pearl River was still called the “Old Benjamin Lee Ferry”, and in 1841 the store he founded was mentioned in an article by the Natchez Free Trader, naming Col. Atkinson as sole surviving partner.

References 
Hebert Bourne - The Columbian-Progress, August 18, 1994.

1774 births
1828 deaths
American militia generals
People from Marion County, Mississippi